Magnus Berg (28 November 1666 – 31 March 1739) was a Norwegian-born wood carver, painter, sculptor and non-fiction writer who settled in Denmark.

Early life and education
Berg was born in Gudbrandsdal  where his father worked for the Selsverket Kobberverk at Sel in Oppland county, Norway.  Ulrik Frederik Gyldenløve who was  viceroy  to (Statholder)  of Norway   discovered  his skill as a woodcarver.  As a young man, Berg was brought to Copenhagen. In 1690–94, the king apprenticed him to the court painter Peder Andersen Normand at Frederiksborg Castle.  As an artist paid by the king, he had to make a four-year study  trip to  Italy and Paris. In 1703 he was appointed  art teacher for the Danish Royal family in Copenhagen.

Berg was most noted for carving miniature reliefs in ivory. Most were acquired by the Danish royal family.
Among his 42 works located at the Rosenborg Castle in Copenhagen is the vase Vannets element. He is also represented at the National Gallery of Norway and in museums in Hamburg, Vienna and Stockholm. A biography of Berg was published in Copenhagen in 1745.

References

External links
 Magnus Berg at Kunstindeks Danmark.

1666 births
1739 deaths
People from Gudbrandsdal
Danish woodcarvers
Norwegian woodcarvers
Norwegian sculptors
Norwegian emigrants to Denmark
17th-century Danish painters
17th-century Danish sculptors
17th-century Danish woodworkers
18th-century Danish painters
18th-century Danish sculptors
18th-century Danish woodworkers
Danish male painters
17th-century Norwegian painters
18th-century Norwegian painters
18th-century male artists
Norwegian male painters
Norwegian non-fiction writers